Gays Against Groomers (GAG) is an American far-right anti-LGBT organization known for protesting against gender-affirming care for minors, including at hospitals that provide it; against LGBT representation at schools; and against Drag Queen Story Hour events. A spokesperson for the LGBT advocacy group GLAAD has claimed that the group uses the slur "groomer" to characterize LGBT people as pedophiles. GAG has hosted anti-LGBTQ rallies, alongside other far-right and anti-LGBTQ organizations such as Moms for Liberty, which have been attended by the Proud Boys.

GAG began in June 2022 as a Twitter account created by Jaimee Michell, who had previously been employed by right-wing communications firms Arsenal Media and X Strategies and posted similar content on her personal account. The account is known for posting anti-trans rhetoric and has been compared to Libs of TikTok. Michell officially incorporated GAG in September. GAG has been banned from multiple social media and payment platforms for violating rules on hate speech; they have been promoted by right-wing media outlets such as Fox News, One America News Network (OANN), and InfoWars.

History 

GAG was founded by Jaimee Michell, at the time a content creator and lead designer at marketing company Arsenal Media, a conservative media organization specializing in creating viral content. GAG's Twitter account was created by Michell on June 6, 2022. Her website featured examples of her work for conservative candidates and activists. Michell had previously been on the advisory board to Donald Trump's "Trump Pride coalition", who she described as a "pro-gay" politician. Leading up to the 2020 United States presidential election, Michell was involved in the "Stop the Steal" movement, to promote conspiracy theories that the election had been "stolen".

Alejandra Caraballo first revealed that Michell founded GAG. Afterward, White Rose AFA researched Michell's online footprint and found a history of sharing far-right content across multiple platforms. Her personal Twitter account accused people of being "pedos" and "groomers" and echoed conspiracy theories about COVID-19 and the 2020 election. Her Reddit account had repeatedly posted racist and Islamaphobic sentiments and at one point a link to her personal website. Michell stated the account was shared, blamed such posts on her ex, and de-activated the account after White Rose AFA posted screenshots of her comment history. Media Matters for America reported her personal Instagram account branded herself as an outspoken right-wing lesbian and pushed anti-trans rhetoric.

In September 2022, GAG was incorporated and launched a partner coalition called Trans Against Groomers.

Michell has denied that anyone is funding the account, and claims the organization is a non-profit, though its application has not been approved. Imara Jones hypothesized that The Heritage Foundation was funding them, noting they have a budget of close to a million dollars and stating it could not have come organically from the community.

Activities

Protests and rallies 
In September, in response to a California school district's decision to paint Progress Pride murals on all school buildings and the administration office, GAG called for a mass protest at their school board meeting.

On September 3, a coalition of far-right groups including GAG, Babies Lives Matter, the Proud Boys, LEXIT, the Palmdale Freedom Coalition, and White Lives Matter planned a QAnon themed "Save the children" rally. The marchers were met by anti-fascists and were joined by members of QueerX, who had been separately protesting city council member Mitch O'Farrell for displacing unhoused communities after Farrell and his supporters left early.

In September, the Miami-Dade School Board decided against declaring October LGBTQ+ History Month. GAG had targeted the school and drove trucks around the city claiming the district teaches "radical gender ideology". Members of the Proud Boys harassed people with hateful rhetoric outside the school board's headquarters.

On December 3, a group of far-right individuals including GAG, Moms for Liberty, and Florida Fathers for Freedom organized and hosted a rally in Fort Lauderdale, Miami. Jordan Toste, the southeast regional leader of GAG, was one of the scheduled speakers. Approximately 20 Proud Boys were also present and flashed white power symbols during the protest. The event was promoted by OANN, Breitbart, and the Goyim Defense League. A counter rally of approximately 50 people was hosted including youth organizers and elected officials, who blamed such rallies on Governor Ron DeSantis' anti-LGBT politics and rhetoric. An organizer of the rally was recorded to have aggressively taunted high school students and attempted to intimidate a student organizer of the protest.

Legislation 
On August 19, 2022, Michell told OANN that they are working toward a federal ban on gender-affirming care for minors.

In January 2023, Robert Wallace, head of the Arizona chapter of GAG, voiced his support for Arizona Senate Bill 1001, which would prohibit teachers and school officials from using students' pronouns unless they have written permission from parents and allow school employees to ignore them for "religious and moral convictions".

The same month, Ryan Woods, a drag artist also known as Lady MAGA USA, represented GAG in support of a ban on gender-affirming care for minors in Utah, saying children were being groomed and referring to Chloe Cole, who also spoke in favor of the bill.

Other

Harassment of individuals 

On December 19 in New York City, two members of GAG associated with the Guardians of Divinity, Erica Sanchez and D'Anna Morgan, taunted and harassed the gay City Council member Erik Bottcher, first at his office then at his home. The two vandalized his office and later broke into the lobby of Boettcher's apartment and left anti-gay slurs graffitied on his sidewalk. Morgan and other members of the Guardians of divinity were also present at a protest against a Drag Story Hour event in Jackson heights along Proud Boys and members of the neo-Nazi Goyim Defense League.

In December, GAG also retweeted footage of Rep. Katie Porter which had been doctored to claim she supported pedophilia. Porter had spoken out against how Twitter had been used to falsely label people as pedophiles.

Public disruptions 
On October 24, a Wauwatosa school board meeting was infiltrated by Michell, speaking for GAG, and the right-wing group Moms for Liberty, neither of which are based in Wauwatosa. They protested the district's new human growth and development curriculum which had been approved months ago, had a 70% approval rating in the district, and was not on the agenda. Michell and Moms for Liberty accused attendees of being groomers, not actually being gay, and wanting to show explicit pictures to children, at one point bringing a 10-year-old student to tears. Both groups had advertised their plan to attend for days beforehand. Michell implied she planned to attend future board meetings and described the curriculum as "child abuse" and "grooming". Parents spoke out against the inclusion of these outside extremist groups.

On November 17, a restaurant in San Luis Obispo received threats over advertising a over-21s drag brunch with the caption "Bring the family!" by mistake. Other establishments in the city had also received threats from the same person over drag events, including those appropriate for all ages. The message had said they chatting with one of the founders of GAG and they'd agreed to assist in advertising the event.

In November, an unidentified group put up door hangers attacking the St. Charles Public Library and School District 303 for their social-emotional learning program. The hangers said schools and libraries are "eroding parental and constitutional rights by promoting the 'sexualization' and 'gender dysphoria' in children as young as preschool, yet are exempt from the prosecution!" The hangers listed resources for people including GAG and MassResistance, which has been designated by the Southern Poverty Law Center as an anti-LGBTQ hate group.

Reception

Criticism 
Alejandra Caraballo, a clinical instructor at Harvard, was the first to reveal that Michell was behind the account and described GAG as "a conservative funded propaganda account to push the groomer libel". GAG used Caraballo's name as a discount code to sell anti-trans merchandise. Them.us described it as a "Great Value version of the notoriously toxic Libs of Tiktok". GAG has been accused of fueling stochastic terrorism, the public condemnation of a group that leads to violent acts against the group.

A spokesperson from GLAAD stated "they are coming from a place of anti-LGBT animus and bigotry" and that they characterize the "LGBTQ+ people as pedophiles falsely and maliciously with the absolutely clear intent of driving fear". The Anti-Defamation League (ADL) described them as "an anti-LGBTQ+ extremist coalition" and stated "while GAG claims that they cannot be anti-gay or anti-lesbian as they themselves identify as gay or lesbian, ADL's definition of anti-LGBTQ+ extremism includes any person who pushes false claims and conspiracy theories about all or parts of the LGBTQ+ community, regardless of how they personally identify".

Appearances in conservative and far-right media 

In an August 2022 interview with OANN, the group's founder compared gender-affirming care to the experiments on Auschwitz prisoners by the Nazi SS doctor Joseph Mengele. Writing in LGBTQ Nation, Alex Bollinger criticized these comments, noting that the Nazis destroyed Magnus Hirschfeld's Institute of Sexology, which "did pioneering work on understanding LGBTQ identities, including transgender people".

On November 8, Michell blamed the Colorado Springs nightclub shooting – where a gunman killed five people, including two trans people, and injured over a dozen more – on gender-affirming care. Appearing on Tucker Carlson Tonight, Michell called the shooting "expected and predictable", saying that "I don't think [the violence is] gonna stop until we end this evil agenda that is attacking children". Brandon Wolf, a survivor of the Orlando nightclub shooting and press secretary of the LGBTQ+ rights group Equality Florida, wrote "here's Gays Against Groomers founder on Fox with a crystal clear threat: 'The mass murders will continue until you do as you're told.

Social media platforms 
Twitter has suspended the account four times, some of which were supposed to be permanent, but kept reinstating it. Before Elon Musk's takeover of Twitter, the website's rules prohibited the use of "groomer" as an insult based on gender identity or expression under their hate speech policy. GAG responded by using code terms such as "broomer" and "gr__mer" and changing its screen name to "Gays Against Grewmers". Some hypothesized that someone at Twitter was manually and repeatedly overriding the suspensions.

When Elon Musk bought Twitter, GAG reverted to its old name, tweeted "OK GROOMER", and purchased a verified badge. In October 2022, the account directly thanked Musk for helping them further their agenda. Before Musk's purchase, tweets using hate terms averaged at most 84 per hour over a week. After the purchase, users tweeted hate speech 4,778 times from midnight to noon. A report from the Human Rights Campaign found that the GAG Twitter account had seen an increase of nearly 300% in their use of the slur "groomer" when comparing the two months before and after Musk's purchase.

Venmo, PayPal, and Google have banned the group from raising funds on their platforms due to their policies prohibiting hate speech. As a result, GAG began to use the fundraising platform Donorbox.

References 

American conspiracy theorists
Anti-LGBT sentiment
Conservative media in the United States
Conspiracist media
Disinformation operations
Far-right politics in the United States
Internet-based activism
LGBT-related controversies in the United States
LGBT youth
Political extremism in the United States
Social media accounts
Twitter accounts
Twitter controversies
Drag events
Organizations that oppose LGBT rights in the United States
LGBT conservatism in the United States